Game piece is a concept of experimental music having its roots with composers Iannis Xenakis, Christian Wolff, John Zorn and Mathius Shadow-Sky. Game pieces may be considered controlled improvisation. An essential characteristic is that there is no pre-arranged sequence of events. They unfold freely according to certain rules, like in a sports game. Therefore, game pieces have elements of improvisation. A number of methods can be used to determine the direction and evolution of the music, including hand gestures. Zorn's game piece "Cobra", which has been recorded several times for various labels, uses a combination of cards and gestures and can be performed by an ensemble of any size and composition. Zorn's game pieces, written in the late 1970s and mid-1980s, include Cobra, Hockey, Lacrosse, and Xu Feng.

Mathius Shadow-Sky (born 1961) developed music gaming system founded on Roger Caillois, Gilles Deleuze, and Lewis Caroll's concepts to create new 'scoring' for music. Starting in 1980 with Ludus Musicae Temporarium for an 'archisonic lamps consort',  followed by several music games among them: The Ephemerodes Card of Chrones in 1984  for a broken piano orchestra, a temporal music game based on elastic rhythms interactions (within nonoctave scales for sliding morphing harmony).

As well as a sports game, a game piece may also be considered analogous to language: The performance is directed by a well-defined set of rules (a grammar) but by no means fixed or predetermined (just as all sentences generated by the same grammar are not the same). The length of a piece may be arbitrary, just as a sentence can be of any imaginable length while still conforming to a strictly defined syntax.

In Formalized Music (2001), Iannis Xenakis mentions two pieces in his oeuvre that utilize game theory: Duel (1959) and Stratégie (1962). The first of these, Duel, involves an orchestra that is broken into two groups, each with a separate conductor. Each conductor chooses from a palette of six modules, and points are assigned to each conductor based on the combinations of modules that occurred. Stratégie expands this process to a larger orchestra, and it simplifies the rules to make performance easier.

References

 Bailey, Derek: Improvisation. Its nature and practise in music, 1992, pp. 75–78.
 Beresford, Steve: "John Zorn interviewed", in: Resonance. Published by London Musician's Collective vol.2, nr. 2, summer, 1994.
 Cox, Christoph and Warner, Daniel: "The Game Pieces", in: Audio Culture: Readings in Modern Music, New York (Continuum), 2004, pp. 196–200.
 Harley, James. Xenakis: His Life in Music. New York: Routledge, 2011.
 Huesmann, Günther: "John Zorn. Über die Verfügbarkeit der Töne" i Ohnesorg, Faanz Xaver: Die Befreiung der Musik. Eine Einführung in die Musik des 20. Jahrhunderts. Köln (Gustav Lübbe Verlag), 1994.
 Lange, Art: Article in booklet of Zorn (1991;I1),
 Lange, Art: "Der Architekt der Spiele. Gespräch mit John Zorn über seine musikalischen Regelsysteme", Neue Zeitschrift für Musik 2, 1991.
 Mandel, Howard: "Howard Mandel interview John Zorn", EAR Magazine Vol. II no. 2, oct., 1986. LOGOS.
 Mandel, Howard: "Ich habe viele kleine Tricks". John Zorn interview. MusikTexte 23, Febr., 1988.
 Mandel, Howard: "Guerilla Strategist: John Zorn interviewed by Howard Mandel", Resonance vol. 6 nr. 1, 1997.
 McGuire, John: "Spiele um des Spiels willen. Der New Yorker Komponist und Musiker John Zorn. MusikTexte 23, February 1988.
 Rovere, Walter; Chiti, Carlo in collaboration with Achilli, Alessandro; chadbourne, Eugene; Coralli, Michele; Romero, Enrico: Itinerari oltre il suono. John Zorn. In Italian and English, Milano/Valdarno (Materiali Sonori Edizioni Musicali snc) 1998.
 Shadow-Sky, Mathius: Ludus Musicae Temporarium, 1980 (music game for angle poise lamp orchestra) http://centrebombe.org/livre/1980.b.html.
 Shadow-Sky, Mathius: The Ephemerodes Card of Chrones, 1984 (music game for broken piano orchestra) http://centrebombe.org/livre/1984a.html. 
 Solothurnmann, Jürg: "Trickfilmmusik" (1986), Landolt, Patrik; Wyss Ruedi (ed.): Die lachenden Aussenseiter. Musikerinnen und Musiker zwischen Jazz, Rock und neuer Musik. Die 80er und 90er Jahre. Ein Buch der Wochenzeitung (WOZ) im Rotpunktverlag. Zürich (Rotpunktverlag), 1993.
 Tetsu, Shiba: Two Game Pieces (English and Japanese versions). https://web.archive.org/web/20080605113636/http://www20.brinkster.com/improarchive/sht.htm
 Watrous, Peter: sleeve notes for John Zorn: Cobra. 2 LP-sæt, hatART 2034, 1986.
 Whitehead, Kevin, "A Field Guide To Cobra," Pulse!, November 1994.
 Xenakis, Iannis. Formalized Music. Stuyvesant, NY: Pendragon Press, 1992.

External links
 - Games for Music, open library of game pieces

Experimental music